Yeo-jin is a Korean feminine given name. Its meaning differs based on the hanja used to write each syllable of the name.

Hanja
There are 15 hanja with the reading "yeo" (and additionally 19 hanja with the reading "ryeo" which are generally spelled and pronounced "yeo" in South Korea) and 48 hanja with the reading "jin" on the South Korean government's official list of hanja which may be used in given names.

Ways of writing this name in hanja include:
: "beautiful treasure"



People
People with this name include:
Hong Yeo-jin (born 1958), South Korean actress
Kim Yeo-jin (born 1972), South Korean actress
Yeojin Bae (born 1975), South Korean-born Australian fashion designer
Choi Yeo-jin (born 1983), South Korean-born Canadian actress
Jeon Yeo-jin (born Jeon Ji-ae, 1984), South Korean actress
Ha Yeo-jin (born 1986), South Korean actress

Fictional characters with this name include:
Gook Yeo-jin, in 2014 South Korean television series Cunning Single Lady
Han Yeo-jin, in 2017-2020 South Korean television series Stranger (TV series)

See also
List of Korean given names

References

Korean feminine given names